Barbican United F.C., commonly referred to as Barbican F.C. or Barbican is a professional football club based in Kingston. that competes in KSAFA Super League, the second tier of Jamaican football. the team plays its home matches at the Barbican Sports Complex in Kingston .

References

Football clubs in Jamaica